Cari Elizabeth Roccaro (born July 18, 1994) is an American soccer midfielder from East Islip, New York, who plays for the Chicago Red Stars in the National Women's Soccer League. She competed for the United States under-20 women's national soccer team and competed with the team to win the 2012 FIFA Under-20 Women's World Cup held in Tokyo, Japan. Roccaro previously played for the New York Fury in the WPSL Elite.

Early life
Roccaro attended East Islip High School in Islip Terrace, New York, where she played for the Redmen. During her senior year, she scored 11 goals with an 11–3–1 record. She was named a First Team ESPNHS All-American, a two-time All-American selection by the National Soccer Coaches Association of America and was Long Island Player of the Year.

Roccaro led the Redmen as team captain as a sophomore, junior, and senior. She was named All-League, All-Conference, and All-County as a freshman, junior, and senior and Team MVP as a freshman and senior. A highly decorated player, she was named NSCAA All-American as a junior and senior and Parade All-American as a junior. She was also named New York Gatorade Player of the Year, Long Island Player of the Year, and New York State Player of the Year as a senior.

Roccaro played for local club team, Albertson Fury and was a member of the Olympic Development Program (ODP) Region I Team from 2007–2010 as well as the Eastern New York state Olympic Development Program (ODP) squad from 2005–2010.

New York Fury
While still in high school, Roccaro played for Long Island Fury in Women's Premier Soccer League, the second tier of women's soccer in the United States. She joined the club New York Fury, in the new WPSL Elite which was created after the folding of Women's Professional Soccer in early 2012.

University of Notre Dame
Roccaro attended the University of Notre Dame where she played as a defender for the Fighting Irish. In January 2013, she was named Soccer America's Women's Freshman of the Year after leading Notre Dame to the quarterfinals of the NCAA Division I Tournament. She was also named Big East Conference Rookie of the Year

Club career

Houston Dash, 2016–2017
Roccaro was selected by the Houston Dash with the 5th overall pick in the 2016 NWSL College Draft. Over two seasons with the Dash, she made 33 appearances. On March 19, 2018, she was waived by the club.

North Carolina Courage, 2018–2021
She signed with North Carolina Courage on April 12, 2018. She made two appearances for the club during the 2018 season. North Carolina won the 2018 NWSL Shield & NWSL Championship.

Angel City, 2022 
In December 2021, the North Carolina Courage traded Roccaro's rights to Los Angeles-based Angel City Football Club (ACFC) in exchange for roster protection in the 2022 NWSL Expansion Draft. In January, 2022, ACFC announced that Rocarro had been signed to a two year contract. Roccaro had four goals and one assist during the 2022 season.

Chicago Red Stars, 2023-Present 
On January 24, 2023, Angel City traded Rocarro to the Chicago Red Stars in exchange for $65,000 in allocation money.

International career

Roccaro has represented the United States as a member of the U-15, U-17, U-18 and U-20 national youth teams. In March 2010, she scored her first international goal in a qualifier match against Haiti during the 2010 FIFA U-17 Women's World Cup. She also played and scored goals for the US during the 2010 CONCACAF Under-17 Women's Championship and 2012 CONCACAF Under-20 Women's Championship.

Roccaro was a member of the United States U-20 squad, which won the 2012 FIFA U-20 Women's World Cup in Japan. She played two matches in the group stage; and played in all three matches in the knock-out stage.

Roccaro captained the United States under-20 women's national soccer team that competed at 2014 FIFA U-20 Women's World Cup in Canada. She played all 360 minutes of the four matches played by the team, which was eliminated in the quarter-final.

Honors

International
 CONCACAF U20 Women's Championship: 2012, 2014
 FIFA U20 Women's World Cup: 2012

Club
North Carolina Courage
NWSL Champions: 2018, 2019
NWSL Shield: 2018, 2019

References

External links
 
 US Soccer player profile
 Notre Dame player profile
 Cari Roccaro's New York Fury statistics
 
 

1994 births
Living people
American women's soccer players
Women's Premier Soccer League Elite players
New York Fury players
Parade High School All-Americans (girls' soccer)
Notre Dame Fighting Irish women's soccer players
People from East Islip, New York
Soccer players from New York (state)
Sportspeople from Suffolk County, New York
Women's association football defenders
Houston Dash players
National Women's Soccer League players
Houston Dash draft picks
United States women's under-20 international soccer players
North Carolina Courage players
Long Island Fury players
Angel City FC players
Chicago Red Stars players